The J.M. Johnson House in Boise, Idaho, is a -story Queen Anne house designed by John E. Tourtellotte and constructed in 1898. The house includes a sandstone foundation and features a Tuscan column porch with a prominent, corner entry at 10th and Franklin Streets. A side gable with a shingled dimple window above a prominent beveled window bay are central to the Franklin Street exposure. The house was added to the National Register of Historic Places in 1982.

J.M. Johnson was a wool buyer from Mountain Home. He moved to Boise in 1898, the year of construction of the J.M. Johnson House. Among his business activities, Johnson traded in real estate and engaged in ranching. In 1919 he sold the J.M. Johnson House after purchasing a 7000-acre cattle ranch in Alturas.

See also
 Fort Street Historic District

References

External links
 
 1898 Queen Anne Cottage in Boise includes interior photographs of the J.M. Johnson House at Captivating Houses, a real estate website.

		
National Register of Historic Places in Boise, Idaho
Queen Anne architecture in Idaho
Houses in Boise, Idaho
Houses completed in 1898